Ryan Hall (born March 9, 1994), known as Ryan Hall, Y’all, is an American YouTuber, TikToker, and an Internet personality. As of January 22, 2023, Hall has accumulated 1.7 million followers on Tiktok and 1  million subscribers on his primary YouTube channel with 300,000 subscribers on his secondary YouTube channel, “Ryan Hall, Y’all XTRA” and 17,000 subscribers on his miscellaneous YouTube channel, “RyanHallTV”.

Hall went to Mississippi State University, pursuing broadcast meteorology, while working at WYMT-TV.  However, Hall chose to leave his degree program and WYMT-TV to work more in the field.

On January 4, 2021, Hall posted his first YouTube video. He livestreamed for the first time in early March 2021, and would draw his first large live audience while livestreaming a tornado outbreak on March 17, 2021. Broadcasting his screen set to multiple paid radar subscription programs, Hall managed to inform and alert viewers on the live locations and impacts of the storms, while explaining safety measures and courses of action for the people to follow. A recurrent format on his channel, his streams have helped his channel grow and reach thousands of people in the path of severe weather, with the help of resharing and forwarding of his videos and broadcasts on social media. Other types of content he uploads include forecasts of upcoming weather, and storm chasing footage. Throughout his YouTube career, Hall has done collaborations with extreme meteorologist and storm chaser Reed Timmer as well as other storm chasers.

On September 11, 2022, Ryan Hall released a video titled Here’s EXACTLY How Much Snow You’ll See This Year (2022), which gained a lot of attention on Twitter for controversy about the thumbnail, title, and video content.  Verified accounts and meteorologists including free-lance meteorologist for Fox5DC Matthew Cappucci, meteorologist Bryan Shaw, KLKN photojournalist Anthony D'Agostino, KPTH meteorologist Katie Nickolaou, and meteorologist for KKTV Luke Victor commented amid the controversy with their respective opinions.

In November 2022, Kim Klockow McClain, a meteorologist and team lead at the Behavioral Insights Unit at the National Oceanic and Atmospheric Administration (NOAA) said, “while the jury is still out on exactly how viewers receive YouTube thumbnails, research suggests if people do fixate on the thumbnails, it could pose a problem.”

References 

1994 births
Living people
American YouTubers
English-language YouTube channels
People from Pikeville, Kentucky
YouTube channels launched in 2012